Debbie Mayfield (born December 2, 1956) is an American politician serving as a Republican member of the Florida Senate who has represented the 17th district, which includes Indian River and southern Brevard Counties, since 2016. She previously served four terms in the Florida House of Representatives, representing parts of the Treasure Coast from 2008 to 2016. She has been majority leader since 2020.

Early life and career
Mayfield, born Deborah Minton, grew up in Pensacola and attended Pensacola High School. She moved to Vero Beach in 1989, and began working for Barnett Bank, eventually rising up to Senior Vice-President of Residential Lending. Mayfield eventually left the bank to start the Mayfield Group, a mortgage brokerage firm that she owned and operated. Prior to running for the state legislature, she served as a member of the Indian River County school board. She married Stan Mayfield.

She no longer lives in Vero Beach. Mayfield now lives in Melbourne.

Florida House of Representatives
When incumbent State Representative Stan Mayfield, her husband, was unable to seek re-election in 2008 due to term limits, she ran to succeed him in the 80th District, which ran along the Treasure Coast, including northern St. Lucie County, eastern Indian River County, and southeastern Brevard County. She won the Republican primary unopposed, and advanced to the general election, where she faced Neal Abarbanell, the Democratic nominee. During the course of the campaign, Mayfield's husband, who was running for Indian River County Tax Collector, died of cancer. Despite this, Mayfield ended up defeating Abarbanell by a wide margin of victory, winning 64% of the vote. In 2010, she was challenged in the Republican primary by Art Argenio and Bradley Ward, who hammered Mayfield for being insufficiently conservative, despite the fact that she voted "consistently with the GOP majority." Mayfield ended defeating both of them handily, winning 52% of the vote to Argenio's 34% and Ward's 15%, and in the general election, she only faced write-in opposition, winning easily.

In 2012, when state legislative districts were redrawn, Mayfield was moved into the 54th District, which included much of the territory that she had previously represented in the 80th District. She won both the primary and general election entirely unopposed.

Florida Senate 
In 2016, Mayfield ran for the Florida Senate seat vacated by Thad Altman, who was term limited. She defeated fellow state representative Ritch Workman in the Republican primary, 42 to 35%, and Democrat Amy Tidd in the general election, 62 to 38%.

In 2020, President of the Senate Wilton Simpson appointed Mayfield as Majority Leader.

References

External links

Florida Senate - Debbie Mayfield
Florida House of Representatives - Debbie Mayfield

|-

|-

|-

1956 births
21st-century American politicians
21st-century American women politicians
Businesspeople from Florida
Republican Party Florida state senators
Living people
Republican Party members of the Florida House of Representatives
People from Pensacola, Florida
People from Vero Beach, Florida
Women state legislators in Florida